Mount House School is a private day school for pupils from 11 to 18.  The school is co-educational and is situated in Monken Hadley, in the London Borough of Barnet. It was previously the Architectural Association School between 1940–45; and then St Martha’s Catholic School for Girls was founded in 1947 at Mount House from the mid-20th Century until 2017.

In September 2017 the school became co-educational and the first intake of boys was accepted into Year 7 and the Sixth Form.

History of Mount House
Mount House, one of the principal buildings of the school, is a grade II* listed house and dates back to the mid-eighteenth century. The attached stable block is also listed.

Joseph Henry Green
Mount House was home to perhaps the most eminent English surgeon of day, Joseph Henry Green MRCS FRCS FRS Hon DCL Oxon from 1836 until his death at the house in 1863.  Green trained at St. Thomas' Hospital before setting up practice at Lincoln's Inn Fields.

In 1820 Green returned to St. Thomas's Hospital and was soon elected Professor of Anatomy at the Royal College of Surgeons before becoming a Fellow of the Royal Society in 1825.  In the same year he became Professor of Anatomy to the Royal Academy of Arts, then located at Somerset House, where he lectured on anatomy and its relation to the fine arts.

On the establishment of King's College in 1830 Green was appointed as the first Chair of Surgery and in 1835 the council of the Royal College of Surgeons elected him twice to the esteemed position of President of the college (from 1849–50 and again from 1858-9).

In 1853 Green was made Doctor of Civil Law (D.C.L.) at the University of Oxford.  Having served as the first representative of the Royal College of Surgeons on the establishment in 1858 of the General Medical Council (GMC), Green was appointed by the government as the second President of the GMC in succession to Sir Benjamin Collins Brodie, and Green held this office until his death at Mount House on 13 December 1863 following an acute seizure a month earlier.

Samuel Taylor Coleridge
Green was also the literary executor to Samuel Taylor Coleridge and he edited the Spiritual Philosophy; founded on the teachings of the late Samuel Taylor Coleridge (1866) which was written at Mount House.

Twentieth century - 2017
Between 1940-45, Mount House was the home of the Architectural Association School during World War II.  The house was then taken over by St Martha's School for Girls until 2017, when it became Mount House School.

Notable staff
 James Brookes, poet and winner of The Telegraph's Poetry Book of the Month Award (February 2018).  Brookes was previously a schoolmaster at Cranleigh School and Haileybury School before joining Mount House.

References

External links
 St Martha's Senior School on the BBC
 St Martha's Convent Senior School on IBSI

1946 establishments in England
Educational institutions established in 1946
Private co-educational schools in London
Private girls' schools in London
Private schools in the London Borough of Barnet
Roman Catholic private schools in the Archdiocese of Westminster